The Staatliche Kunsthalle (State Art Gallery) is an art museum in Karlsruhe, Germany.

The museum, created by architect Heinrich Hübsch, opened in 1846 after nine years of work in a neoclassical building next to the Karlsruhe Castle and the Karlsruhe Botanical Garden. This historical building with its subsequent extensions now houses the part of the collection covering the 14th to the 19th century while the 20th century is displayed in the nearby building of the Botanical Gardens's former orangery.

The museum notably displays paintings by the Master of the Karlsruhe Passion, Matthias Grünewald (most notably the Tauberbischofsheim Altarpiece), Albrecht Dürer, Hans Baldung, Lucas Cranach the Elder, Hans Burgkmair, Rembrandt, Pieter de Hooch, Peter Paul Rubens, David Teniers the Younger, Hyacinthe Rigaud, Claude Lorrain, Nicolas Poussin, Jean-Baptiste-Siméon Chardin, Eugène Delacroix, Gustave Courbet, Édouard Manet, Camille Pissarro, Claude Monet, Edgar Degas, Auguste Renoir, Paul Cézanne, Paul Gauguin, Caspar David Friedrich, Hans Thoma, Lovis Corinth, August Macke, Ernst Ludwig Kirchner, Erich Heckel, Franz Marc, Jean-Marc Nattier, Max Pechstein, Max Ernst, Kurt Schwitters, Juan Gris, Yves Tanguy, Robert Delaunay, Otto Dix and Fritz von Uhde.

Gallery

See also
 List of art museums
 List of museums in Germany

External links 
Homepage of the museum 
Virtual tour of the Staatliche Kunsthalle Karlsruhe provided by Google Arts & Culture

Art museums and galleries in Baden-Württemberg
Buildings and structures in Karlsruhe
Art museums established in 1846
1846 establishments in Germany
Tourist attractions in Karlsruhe